Kayak II may refer to:

Kayak II (horse)
Kayak II (album)